Bates Glacier is a small tributary glacier flowing north from the west side of Mount Queensland, and entering the west side of Campbell Glacier just north of Mills Peak, in Victoria Land, Antarctica. It was named by the Northern Party of the New Zealand Geological Survey Antarctic Expedition, 1965–66, for D.R. Bates, field assistant with that party.

See also
 List of glaciers in the Antarctic
 Glaciology

References
 

Glaciers of Borchgrevink Coast